Bolts and Blip is a computer-animated television series aired on Teletoon from 2010 to 2011. The show has also aired on 3net at 10:30 am on Sundays, and The CW's Saturday morning block, Vortexx, from July 13, 2013 at 8:30 a.m.

Plot
The series is a comic action adventure set on the moon in 2080. It follows two central city misfits, Bolts & Blip, who accidentally find themselves as members of the Lunar League's last placed team the Thunderbolts. With the help of their rag-tag band of teammates, the two friends discover what they are made of in this intergalactic sports circuit.

Characters

Main characters
Blip (Voiced by Matt Murray) - The main protagonist and one of the title characters. Blip is a bumbling Civi-Bot who attempts to keep within societal norms, but isn't very successful. He is best friend and roommate to the wacky Bolts, and often must drag his impulsive friend out of trouble. He is the more mature, level-headed of the duo. He along with Bolts were accidentally drafted into the Lunar League's bottom team, The Thunderbolts. He has a huge crush on Saedee, who spends most of the series ignoring his displays of affection, while occasionally letting slip possible mutual feelings, before revealing in the season finale she too loves Blip. Late in the series he is revealed to be Dr. Tommy's Secret Bot, and has latent powers, which he calls his "Super Mode"; in this state he is taller, stronger, faster, and can fly. He has a pet mouse like robot named Squeaker, who prior to undergoing training was very violent and attacked everyone, But nowadays he only attacks Bolts.
Bolts/Blood's Bot/Darth Boltor (Voiced by Terry McGurrin) -  The secondary protagonist and one of the two title characters. Bolts is immature, impulsive and has a talent for getting himself into trouble; including one time where he put himself under huge debt to a Robot Mafia Leader Vinnie Two-Chimes, after losing a bet in a (fixed) sock fight match. But he does occasionally show he has some common sense as seen in Little Squeaker when he thinks it's a bad idea to show Squeaker around to the Thunderbolts after Squeaker viciously attacked both him and Saedee's housewarming present. He also shows some signs of intelligence and ingenuity as also seen in little Squeaker when he modified an illegal weapon to bring up to legal standards only to have his talented creation shot down by Gridiron telling the sport was a croquet sport match and not a battle. He's the team's jokester and often drives Coach Gridiron insane. He once entered a secret (and illegal) wrestling tournament under the name Bolto de Fuego (a play on Bola de Fuego), and has continued using the name Boltor as his screen name. Like Blip he has latent powers, where his eyes will turn red and he gains monstrous strength. He is eventually revealed to be "Blood's Bot", the ultimate creation of Dr. Blood.

Supporting characters
Saedee (Voiced by Melissa Altro) - The gorgeous heroine Saedee, who is Captain of the Thunderbolts. She is a prototype model from her production line, and as a result has a habit of malfunctioning, usually in the form of her legs involuntarily kicking or falling off. Blip has a huge crush on her, and while her feelings are mutual she tries very hard to hide this, instead lusting over Tigrr Jaxxon.
Coach Gridiron (Voiced by Patrick Garrow) - Short-tempered and combustible, Coach Gridiron employs harsh training routines in an attempt to bolster their bottom placed ranking, however deep down, behind all the raging steam he can be compassionate and understanding. His head has a habit of steaming and blowing off.
Tigrr Jaxxon (voiced by Glenn Coulson) - The star player of the Lunar League. He is on the All Stars team, which (unsurprisingly) are the top of the Lunar League. He is very arrogant and prideful, but (as many find out over the course of the series) he isn't very bright. In the episode, "Tigrr By The Tail", it also revealed he is secretly a coward. He was initially implied to be Blood's Bot, but the team investigate and discover otherwise. His name is a reference to Tiger Jackson.
Dr. Arthur Blood (Voiced by Colin Fox) - The main antagonist of the series, he is an evil human scientist who was formally colleague to Dr. Tommy. He is usually seen in a hover-chair with his back facing the camera. He created the Bloodbots, who all look the same, and are devoid of emotion, designed only for violence. He reorganized into the first Galactic Shadow Empire
D-Gor - Dr. Arthur Blood's unfortunate servant, who is a parody of Igor. Like Igor he is deformed, and hunched. Dr. Blood likes to use him as a means of venting his anger, by yelling at him or smashing his fist on top of his head (shown in the Opening Sequence).

Minor and recurring characters
 Steve (voiced by Jonathan Wilson) – The diminutive, long-suffering assistant to Coach Gridiron. Steve is constantly overlooked and scorned by his peers, due to his diminutive size and incompetence. Steve is very short, speaks with an English accent, and has a single wheel in place of legs. When he isn't slaving for the team's every whim, he secretly plots elevating his own status, wanting Coach Gridiron's job. He has a particularly hostile relationship with Bolts, and they have physical confrontations on several occasions, especially during the time when he and Bolts both entered in the wrestling tournament (under the guise the Silver Steve), with him and Bolts being the main attractions.
 Welder (voiced by Martin Julien) – A gentle giant, who longs for days when he was younger and shinier.
 Ratch-8 (voiced by Paul Wensley) – A teammate on the Thunderbolts. His name is a pun on the word "ratchet".
 The Reformatter – A fearsome monstrous machine who captures robots and remakes them into electronic appliances. He is feared by all robots in the Lunar League. Blip once says: "No one has ever gone inside and come out looking the same."
 Dr. Tommy (voiced by Dwayne Hill) - He is the genius doctor who created every Robot living on the moon, with the exception of the Blood-bots and Blood's Bot (a robot created by Dr. Blood as his secret weapon). He also created the Dr. Tommy's bot (revealed to be Blip) and the mysterious Black Box, which has many untold powers. He and Dr. Blood were formerly colleagues, but upon discovering Blood's evil plans of world domination, turned on him. He appears mostly in flashbacks throughout the series, and finally appears in person in the Season Finale, where his face is finally revealed.
 The Blood Bots - Dr. Blood's shock troops. They all look exactly the same; red (with Dr. Blood's patterns), rounded, a single glowing slit for eyes, speaking in robotic monotone voices, mounted cannons instead of left hands, and they hover above the ground (lacking feet). They seem to be devoid of emotion, other than that of unquestioningly obeying Dr. Blood's every command. It is explained by Dr. Tommy this is because unlike his robots, the Blood-bots have no hearts. This also gives rise to them being very socially inept. They are despised by every team in the Lunar League.
 Klank Lockton and Lock Clankton (both voiced by Dwayne Hill) - The two robot announcers for the Lunar League. Clank Lockton is obnoxious and overbearing, always hogging the screen and putting down his fellow announcer Lock Clankton. Lock virtually never gets the chance to talk or announce anything, as any of his attempts always result in Clank pushing him aside. His voice is heard in episodes 4, 24, and especially 26, when he announces the final showdown between the robots and Dr. Blood.
 Vinnie Two-Chimes – The fearsome robot mob-boss, who is in fact a tiny, primitively designed, box-shaped robot on two wheels. He completely lacks human features (no head, arms, legs), only possessing two blinking lights and communicates via beeps. He is however in charge of two towering robot henchman who do his dirty work. He has scammed Bolts on numerous occasions, and for a large portion of the series Bolts has been in debt to him. A running gag is Bolts' endless, vain attempts to acquire money to pay off his never ending debt.
 Motbot – A shady bot who has a habit of hiding in trash cans, he is Blip's link to his secret origins, and acts as his mentor, guiding him to his destiny as Dr. Tommy's Secret Bot.
 The Schleprechauns – Robot Leprechauns who scavenge for scrap metal to turn into Goldium, a highly prized element able to enhance any electronic device's functions and capabilities.
 Helsing-V – A vampire hunter, and a parody of Van Helsing. He appears when Dr. Blood unleashes a Robot-Vampire Virus that infects the whole Thunderbolts team, and teams up with Blip to fight the Robot-Vampires and find a cure. He also made an appearance in the season finale. He has a habit of throwing smoke bombs and disappearing in mysterious puffs of smoke.
 Supreme Ambassador Garry – The man in control of Earth Command, he does what he likes from getting Gridiron re-programmed to helping organise the goings on in Lunar City. A rather overbearing and demeaning person, he'll often disregard his responsibilities in favour of a good game of golf.

Series overview

Episode list

References

Teletoon original programming
2010 Canadian television series debuts
2011 Canadian television series endings
2010s Canadian animated television series
2010s Canadian comic science fiction television series
2010 South Korean television series debuts
2011 South Korean television series endings
2010s South Korean animated television series
Canadian children's animated action television series
Canadian children's animated space adventure television series
Canadian children's animated comic science fiction television series
Canadian children's animated science fantasy television series
South Korean children's animated action television series
South Korean children's animated adventure television series
South Korean children's animated comic science fiction television series
South Korean children's animated science fantasy television series
Canadian computer-animated television series
Animated television series about robots